Dallas Kinney (born 1937 in Buckeye, Hardin County, Iowa), is a photojournalist who won the 1970 Pulitzer Prize in photography for his photographs of Florida migrant workers for The Palm Beach Post.  As a newspaper journalist, Dallas has also worked for the Washington Evening Journal in Washington, Iowa, The Dubuque Telegraph Herald, in Dubuque, Iowa, The Miami Herald in Miami, Florida, and The Philadelphia Inquirer in Philadelphia, Pennsylvania.

Kinney was a student of photographer Ansel Adams in Carmel, California. Kinney has a passion for and continuing desire to create "Ansel Adams-like" photographs as they exist in current times.

In addition to the Pulitzer, Kinney has received the following awards:  Robert F. Kennedy Journalism Award, World Press Association/Photojournalism, National Press Photographers Association  Regional, Iowa News Photographer of the Year, Florida News Photographer of the Year.

Kinney resides with his wife Martha near the North Georgia mountain town of Dahlonega.

References

External links
 Robert F. Kennedy Award
 Dallas Kinney Website

Living people
1937 births
Pulitzer Prize for Feature Photography winners
American photojournalists
People from Lumpkin County, Georgia